The bishop (♗, ♝) is a piece in the game of chess. It moves and captures along  without jumping over intervening pieces. Each player begins the game with two bishops. The starting squares are c1 and f1 for White's bishops, and c8 and f8 for Black's bishops.

Placement and movement
The king's bishop is placed between the king and the king's knight, f1 for White and f8 for Black; the queen's bishop is placed between the queen and the queen's knight, c1 for White and c8 for Black.

The bishop has no restrictions in distance for each move but is limited to diagonal movement. It cannot jump over other pieces. A bishop captures by occupying the square on which an enemy piece stands. As a consequence of its diagonal movement, each bishop always remains on one square color. Due to this, it is common to refer to a bishop as a light-squared or dark-squared bishop.

Comparison – other pieces

Versus rook

A rook is generally worth about two pawns more than a bishop. The bishop has access to only half of the squares on the board, whereas all squares of the board are accessible to the rook. On an empty board, a rook always attacks fourteen squares regardless of position, whereas a bishop attacks no more than thirteen (one of four center squares) and sometimes as few as seven (sides and corners). Also, a king and rook can force checkmate against a lone king, while a king and bishop cannot. However, a king and two bishops on opposite-colored squares can force mate.

Versus knight
Knights and bishops are each worth about three pawns. This means bishops are approximately equal in strength to knights, but depending on the game situation, either may have a distinct advantage.

Less experienced players tend to underrate the bishop compared to the knight because the knight can reach all squares and is more adept at forking. More experienced players understand the power of the bishop.

Bishops usually gain in relative strength towards the endgame as more pieces are captured and more open lines become available on which they can operate. A bishop can easily influence both wings simultaneously, whereas a knight is less capable of doing so. In an open endgame, a pair of bishops is decidedly superior to either a bishop and a knight, or two knights. A player possessing a pair of bishops has a strategic weapon in the form of a long-term threat to trade down to an advantageous endgame.

Two bishops on opposite-colored squares and king can force checkmate against a lone king, whereas two knights cannot. A bishop and knight can force mate, but with far greater difficulty than two bishops.

In certain positions a bishop can by itself lose a move (see triangulation and tempo), while a knight can never do so. The bishop is capable of skewering or pinning a piece, while the knight can do neither. A bishop can in some situations hinder a knight from moving. In these situations, the bishop is said to be "dominating" the knight.

On the other hand, in the opening and middlegame a bishop may be hemmed in by pawns of both players, and thus be inferior to a knight which can jump over them. A knight check cannot be blocked but a bishop check can. Furthermore, on a crowded board a knight has many tactical opportunities to fork two enemy pieces. A bishop can fork, but opportunities are more rare. One such example occurs in the position illustrated, which arises from the Ruy Lopez: 1.e4 e5 2.Nf3 Nc6 3.Bb5 a6 4.Ba4 Nf6 5.0-0 b5 6.Bb3 Be7 7.d4 d6 8.c3 Bg4 9.h3 Bxf3 10.Qxf3 exd4 11.Qg3 g6 12.Bh6

Game use

Good bishop and bad bishop

In the middlegame, a player with only one bishop should generally place friendly pawns on squares of the color that the bishop cannot move to. This allows the player to control squares of both colors, allows the bishop to move freely among the pawns, and helps fix enemy pawns on squares on which they can be attacked by the bishop. Such a bishop is often referred to as a "good" bishop.

Conversely, a bishop which is impeded by friendly pawns is often referred to as a "bad bishop" (or sometimes, disparagingly, a "tall pawn"). The black light-squared bishop in the French Defense is a notorious example of this concept. A "bad" bishop, however, need not always be a weakness, especially if it is outside its own . In addition, having a "bad" bishop may be advantageous in an opposite-colored bishops endgame. Even if the bad bishop is passively placed, it may serve a useful defensive function; a well-known quip from GM Mihai Suba is that "Bad bishops protect good pawns."

In the position from the game Krasenkow versus Zvjaginsev, a thicket of black pawns hems in Black's bishop on c8, so Black is effectively playing with one piece fewer than White. Although the black pawns also obstruct the white bishop on e2, it has many more attacking possibilities, and thus is a good bishop vis-à-vis Black's bad bishop. Black resigned after another ten moves.

Fianchetto

A bishop may be fianchettoed, for example after moving the g2 pawn to g3 and the bishop on f1 to g2. This can form a strong defense for the castled king on g1 and the bishop can often exert strong pressure on the long diagonal (here h1–a8). A fianchettoed bishop should generally not be given up lightly, since the resulting  in the pawn formation may prove to be serious weaknesses, particularly if the king has castled on that side of the board.

There are nonetheless some modern opening lines where a fianchettoed bishop is given up for a knight in order to double the opponent's pawns, for example 1.d4 g6 2.c4 Bg7 3.Nc3 c5 4.d5 Bxc3+!? 5.bxc3 f5, a sharp line originated by Roman Dzindzichashvili. Giving up a fianchettoed queen's bishop for a knight is usually less problematic. For example, in Karpov–Browne, San Antonio 1972, after 1.c4 c5 2.b3 Nf6 3.Bb2 g6, Karpov gave up his fianchettoed bishop with 4.Bxf6! exf6 5.Nc3, doubling Black's pawns and giving him a hole on d5.

Endgame
An endgame in which each player has only one bishop, one controlling the dark squares and the other the light, will often result in a draw even if one player has a pawn or sometimes two more than the other. The players tend to gain control of squares of opposite colors, and a deadlock results. In endgames with same-colored bishops, however, even a positional advantage may be enough to win.

Bishops on opposite colors

Endgames in which each player has only one bishop (and no other pieces besides the king) and the bishops are on opposite colors are often drawn, even when one side has an extra pawn or two. Many of these positions would be a win if the bishops were on the same color.

The position from Wolf versus Leonhardt (see diagram) shows an important defensive setup. Black can make no progress, since the white bishop ties the black king to defending the pawn on g4 and it also prevents the advance ...f3+ because it would simply  the pawn – then either the other pawn is exchanged for the bishop (an immediate draw) or the pawn advances (an easily drawn position). Otherwise the bishop alternates between the squares d1 and e2.

If two pawns are connected, they normally win if they reach their sixth , otherwise the game may be a draw (as above). If two pawns are separated by one  they usually draw, but win if they are farther apart.

In some cases with more pawns on the board, it is actually advantageous to have the bishops on opposite colors if one side has weak pawns. The game continued:

29.Kd2 Ke7 30.Kc3 f6 31.Kd4 Be6 32.Kc5 Kd7 33.Kb6 g5 34.Kxa6 Kc7 35.Bb6+ Kc8 36.Bc5 Kc7 37.Bf8 f5 38.Bxg7 f4 39.Bf6 f3 40.gxf3 exf3 41.Bxg5 Bxh3 42.Bf4+

Wrong bishop

In an endgame with a bishop, in some cases the bishop is the "wrong bishop", meaning that it is on the wrong color of square for some purpose (usually promoting a pawn). This results in some positions being drawn (by setting up a fortress) which otherwise would be won.

History

The bishop's predecessor in medieval chess, shatranj (originally chaturanga), was the alfil, meaning "elephant", which could leap two squares along any diagonal, and could jump over an intervening piece. As a consequence, each fil was restricted to eight squares, and no fil could attack another. The modern bishop first appeared shortly after 1200 in Courier chess. The game is attributed to "India", then a very vague term. About half a century later Muḥammad ibn Maḥmud al-Āmulī, in his Treasury of the Sciences, describes an expanded form of chess with two pieces moving "like the rook but obliquely". The bishop was also independently invented in Japan at about the same time (the 13th century), where it formed part of sho shogi and dai shogi; it remains present in modern shogi as the direct descendant of sho shogi.

Derivatives of alfil survive in the languages of the two countries where chess was first introduced within Western Europe—Italian and Spanish.

The etymology of "bishop" comes from Old English bisceop "bishop, high priest," from Late Latin episcopus, from Greek episkopos "watcher, overseer." The term "bishop" as applied specifically to the chess piece was first recorded in the 16th century, with the first known written example dating back to the 1560s. In all other Germanic languages, except for Icelandic, it is called various names, all of which directly translate to English as "runner" or "messenger". In Icelandic, however, it is called "", with the same meaning as in English. The use of the term in Icelandic predates that of the English language, as the first mentioning of "" in Icelandic texts dates back to the early part of the 14th century, while the 12th-century Lewis Chessmen portray the bishop as an unambiguously ecclesiastical figure. In the Saga of Earl Mágus, which was written in Iceland somewhere between 1300–1325, it is described how an emperor was checkmated by a bishop. This has led to some speculations as to the origin of the English use of the term "bishop".

The canonical chessmen date back to the Staunton chess set of 1849. The piece's deep groove symbolizes a bishop's (or abbot's) mitre. Some have written that the groove originated from the original form of the piece, an elephant with the groove representing the elephant's tusks. The English apparently chose to call the piece a bishop because the projections at the top resembled a mitre.

In some Slavic languages (e.g. Czech/Slovak) the bishop is called střelec/strelec, which directly translates to English as a "shooter" meaning an archer, while in others it is still known as "elephant" (e.g. Russian ). In South Slavic languages it is usually known as lovac, meaning "hunter", or laufer, taken from the German name for the same piece (laufer is also a co-official Polish name for the piece alongside goniec). An alternative name for bishop in Russian is "officer"; it is also called  in Greek,  in Belarusian and oficeri in Albanian.

In Mongolian and several Indian languages it is called the "camel".

Name translations

Unicode

Unicode defines two codepoints for bishop:

♗ U+2657 White Chess Bishop (HTML &#9815;)

♝ U+265D Black Chess Bishop (HTML &#9821;)

See also

Notes

References

External links

Piececlopedia: Bishop by Fergus Duniho and Hans Bodlaender, The Chess Variant Pages

Chess pieces